This is the progression of world record improvements of the high jump M90 division of Masters athletics.

Key

References

Masters Athletics High Jump list

Masters athletics world record progressions
High